Lam is a municipality in the district of Cham in Bavaria in Germany. It lies within the scenic valley of the Lamer Winkel.

People 
 Gabriele Krone-Schmalz (born 1949), German journalist

References

Cham (district)